Antonis Gioukoudis (born 13 May 1969) is a Greek former footballer who played as a forward. He spent ten years playing in the Alpha Ethniki for Aris Thessaloniki and PAOK, and made an appearance for the Greece national team.

Career
Gioukoudis joined Aris Thessaloniki from Anagennisi Epanomi in 1987. He made his sole appearance for Greece in January 1992, in a friendly against Albania. In the summer of 1993 he joined PAOK, where he made 125 appearances. He finished his career at Poseidon in 1998.

References

1969 births
Living people
Association football forwards
Greek footballers
Greece international footballers
Aris Thessaloniki F.C. players
PAOK FC players
Football League (Greece) players
Mediterranean Games gold medalists for Greece
Mediterranean Games medalists in football
Competitors at the 1991 Mediterranean Games
Footballers from Central Macedonia
People from Thessaloniki (regional unit)